Tierra de Barros is a comarca in the province of Badajoz, Extremadura, Spain. Its capital and administrative center is Almendralejo. The comarca contains 15 municipalities and 74,872 inhabitants (INE 2008).

Economy
Tierra de Barros is a wine growing region, particularly for Cayetana grapes. It is one of the regions were Ribera del Guadiana DOC wine is produced.

References

Comarcas of Extremadura
Province of Badajoz